Park Jin-joo (born December 24, 1988) is a South Korean actress. She starred in television series such as Jealousy Incarnate (2016) and Something About 1 Percent (2016).

Filmography

Film

Television series

Web series

Television show

Radio shows

Theater

Awards and nominations

References

External links

1988 births
Living people
People from Gwangju
South Korean television actresses
South Korean film actresses
South Korean musical theatre actresses
South Korean stage actresses
Seoul Institute of the Arts alumni